Sphodromantis tenuidentata, common name Tanzanian mantis, is a species of praying mantis found in Tanzania.

See also
African mantis
List of mantis genera and species

References

T
Mantodea of Africa
Insects of Tanzania
Insects described in 1991